The Huntsville Open was a professional golf tournament on the Nike Tour. The tournament was held annually from 1994 to 1998. It was played at Cherokee Ridge Country Club in Union Grove, Alabama, from 1994 to 1997. It was played at Hampton Cove Golf Course (Highlands Course) in Huntsville, Alabama, in 1998.

In 1998 the winner earned $40,500.

Winners

Notes

References

Former Korn Ferry Tour events
Golf in Alabama
Sports in Huntsville, Alabama
Recurring sporting events established in 1994
Recurring sporting events disestablished in 1998
1994 establishments in Alabama
1998 disestablishments in Alabama